Foster is an unincorporated community in the town of Clear Creek in Eau Claire County, Wisconsin, United States. It lies approximately 9 miles south-southwest of Fall Creek, 7 miles southeast of Cleghorn, and 6 miles northwest of Osseo. Located primarily along Eau Claire County Highway "HH", it is flanked on the west by U.S. Highway 53 and on the east by Interstate 94, being the site of I-94's exit #81 in Wisconsin, placing it 11 miles southeast along the freeway from southeastern Eau Claire and 7 miles northwest of Osseo.

History
The community was originally called Emmett, but the name was changed to Foster in honor of George E. Foster, who financed the Fairchild and North-Eastern Railway, which ran from Foster to Fairchild in 1912.

Two people were killed by an F3 tornado that struck Foster on August 27, 1994.

References

External links
History of the Allen School District
Significant and potentially significant tornadoes in northern Wisconsin since 1980

Unincorporated communities in Eau Claire County, Wisconsin
Unincorporated communities in Wisconsin